Nikolai Fedorovich Pasko (1918-1982) - ace pilot, colonel of the Soviet Army, participant in the Great Patriotic and Korean Wars, Hero of the Soviet Union (1945).

Biography 
Nikolai Pasko was born on December 12, 1918 in the village of Skripai (now in the Zmiyovsky district of the Kharkov region of Ukraine). After graduating from seven classes of school, he worked as a mechanic at a factory. He studied at the flying club, graduated from the school of instructor pilots. In December 1939, Pasko was called up for service in the Red Army. In 1940, he graduated from the Kachin Military Aviation Pilot School. Member of the CPSU (b) party since 1942. Since October 1942 he participated in the battles of the Great Patriotic War.

In March 1945, Senior Lieutenant Nikolai Pasko commanded a squadron of the 28th Guards Fighter Aviation Regiment of the 5th Guards Fighter Aviation Division of the 11th Fighter Air Corps of the 3rd Air Army of the 3rd Belorussian Front. By that time, he had made 265 sorties, took part in 32 air battles, shot down 15 enemy aircraft, and inflicted heavy losses on the enemy during air raids.

By decree of the Presidium of the Supreme Soviet of the USSR of August 18, 1945, for "the courage and heroism shown, downing 15 enemy planes" Guard Lieutenant Nikolai Pasko was awarded the title of Hero of the Soviet Union with the Order of Lenin and the Gold Star medal number 8892.

After the end of the war, Pasko continued to serve in the Soviet Army. Participated in the battles of the Korean War as commander of the 67th Fighter Aviation Regiment (piloting the MIG-15 aircraft). He did not win in air battles. In December 1950, Pasko's regiment was transferred to mainland China, where Pasko trained North Korean and Chinese pilots to fly the MIG-15. In 1953 he graduated from the Higher tactical flight courses. In 1956, with the rank of colonel, Pasko was transferred to the reserve. He lived and worked first in his native village, where he was elected chairman of the collective farm, then in Kharkov. He died on July 16, 1982, was buried at the Kharkov city cemetery No. 4.

He was awarded the Order of Lenin, three Orders of the Red Banner, the Order of the Red Star, the Orders of the Patriotic War of the 1st degree and the Red Star, a number of medals (“For the Capture of Koenigsberg”, “For Military Merit”, etc.).

References

Books 
 
 
 
 

Heroes of the Soviet Union
Soviet military personnel of World War II
Recipients of the Order of Lenin